Mehdi-Gholi Masoud-Ansari (is a former Iranian football player. He played for Iran national football team in 1951 Asian Games.

Club career
He previously played for the Shahin from 1948–1951 and Taj from 1951–1952.

Honours
Iran
Asian Games Silver medal: 1951

References

External links

 Mehdi Masoud-Ansari at TeamMelli.com

Iranian footballers
Esteghlal F.C. players
Shahin FC players
Asian Games silver medalists for Iran
Asian Games medalists in football
Footballers at the 1951 Asian Games
Medalists at the 1951 Asian Games
Association football forwards
Year of birth missing
Iran international footballers
1978 deaths